Birtamod (Nepali: बिर्तामोड नगरपालिका) is a municipality in Jhapa District of Nepal. It is the commercial, educational and transport hub of Jhapa District. Sarnamati Bazar, Dhulabari Bazar, Dhaijan Bazar, Charali Bazar, Shivasatakshi Bazar, Kamatoli Bazar, Chakchaki Bazar and Surunga Bazar are some of the nearest local towns/settlements connected to Birtamod. it is one of the fastest growing city in Nepal. Birtamod is the  largest city of Jhapa as well as in Mechi zone.

History
The town was under the Anarmani Village Development Committee and was transformed into a municipality in May 2014.  It merged with Charpane VDC and then merged with Garamani VDC in 2017.

Birtamod was originally part of a great forest. Due to the presence of mosquitos and the threat of malaria, very few people lived here. Later, the forests were cleared off for cultivating the fertile lands. Slowly, people of the hills started to migrate here. These peoples were accompanied by the Nepalese who returned home from the Indian territories of Assam and West Bengal. The ethnic communities, Rajbanshi, Dhimal, etc. are the indigenous people of Birtamod and Jhapa as a whole. Birtamod started to rise when the East West Highway passed through it. Being at the physical center of the district, it started to rise as a center for commercial activities. Birtamod took a greater rise at the time of the Maoist insurgency when trade and banking of the whole Jhapa district became concentrated in Birtamod.

Transportation
Birtamod is connected to all parts of the country by a central highway, the Mahendra Highway which runs throughout the length of the country from east to west. Chandragadhi (Bhadrapur) Airport is located in Bhadrapur (about 12 km from Birtamod) and serves 5 to 6 daily flights to and from Kathmandu. Buddha Air, Yeti Airlines, Shree Airlines and Saurya Airlines are some of the airlines that have daily flights to and from Kathmandu, the capital of Nepal. There are various means of transportation in Birtamod but the major means of transportation is via local bus.

Major cities nearby

 Damak
 Mechinagar
 Surunga
 Bhadrapur
 Arjundhara
 Charali

Demography

Caste And Ethnic groups

Languages

Climate
The climate of Birtamod is hot and humid during summer, and mild and dry during winter. During the summer, temperatures can reach 38 degree Celsius, and the low in winter is about 2 degrees Celsius. Rainfall is abundant during the monsoon season (June–September). There is little or no rainfall during winter, which makes it ideal for harvesting crops such as rice, wheat and mustard.

Industry and agriculture
Because of the fertile soil, the land around Birtamod is well suited for agriculture. Rice, wheat, mustard and tea are some of the crops that are grown seasonally. Rice and Wheat is cultivated during the monsoon season when there is abundant rainfall, and harvested during the dry winter months. Several large tea estates and processing factories are located just east of Birtamod. Giri Bandhu Tea Estate (गिरी बन्धु चिया बगान), New Giri Bandhu and Sons Tea Estate, and Buttabari Tea Processing are the major ones. Apart from agriculture the industrial trends are growing. Various cement factories are present to fulfill local requirement of cements at small scale production capacity.

The revolution of information technology in Nepal has effects in Birtamod. The establishment of an IT industry in Birtamod take more effective in Human Resource in Birtamod for outsourcing business.

Bitamod has a shopping mall called Hanuman Central.

Lot of new ecommerce delivery companies are now delivering products to local residents too along with supporting local retailers. Most prominent one is sanohaat.com.

Business
Birtamod got its business identity as trading hub with the passage of Mahendra Highway and Mechi Highway. Production of hills started being collected and distributed from Birtamod. In the similar fashion, imported products started being sent to hills via Birtamod. Shorty, after being a trading hub, manufacturing activities started at about Birtamod. Alongside, started the rise of service sectors. One can get almost everything at retail and wholesale market of Birtamod that is imported into Nepal. Major products manufactured about Birtamod are: Steel, Cement, Ply, Concrete blocks, Plastic Pipes, Tea, Bricks, alike. Major services available at Birtamod are: School and College Education, Accounting, Business Consultation, Audit, Banking, Transportation, etc.

Culture
The culture of Birtamod is a mix of cultures of various ethnicities, but these two festival seasons are the most important, partly because of 68% of Nepal's population being Hindu and 18% of the population being Buddhist.

Lhosar:(ल्होसार) This festival is celebrated three times once a year. The various combination of Buddhism community such as major community of Tamang celebrate Sonam Lhosar in Marga, Sherpa Community celebrate Gyalpo Lhosar in Falgun as well as Gurung Community celebrate Tamu Lhosar in Poush.
Dashain: (दशै) Dashain is celebrated by the Hindu's and is an exciting time for families to get together and meet relatives and each other. This festival lasts for 15 days. Celebrations and shopping are common during this time and so are religious ceremonies.
Tihar and Dipawali: (तिहार) Tihar lasts five days, including a day called Laksmi Puja which coincides with Dipawali. Dipawali is a Hindu festival of lights and colors. People light up their house with little lamps called diya, generally fueled with mustard oil, and burst firecrackers all night long during the five days of Tihar.

Education

Manakamana Multiple College

Incidents
 March 22, 2006: Nine policemen and three Maoist rebels were killed during a clash at Birtamod police station and traffic office. A group of Maoists, loaded in three trucks attacked the office at around 7:00 am. In the attack, 20 policemen and two civilians were injured. The injured civilians were under detention and were being held in police custody when the attack took place. Most of the injured policemen were airlifted to Kathmandu for immediate medical treatment because the local hospitals where not able to handle severe trauma victims. Several Maoist rebels were also killed and injured when the truck carrying the rebels overturned during retreat.
October 27, 2017: Locals started a rebellion against the government for not investigating a child's unknown death a week prior. The police were forced to control the rebellion using weapons and gas.  Three of the rebels were killed on the spot and six others including some policeman were fatally injured. The injured were treated in a local hospital. Locals in rage struck the whole eastern part of Nepal for three days. The debate was settled by a discussion between government officials and the victims.

Images

Footnotes

Populated places in Jhapa District
Nepal municipalities established in 2014
Municipalities in Koshi Province
Municipalities in Jhapa District